Stittsville is a suburban community, part of the Canadian capital of Ottawa, Ontario. It is within the former Goulbourn Township. The urban part of the community corresponds to Stittsville Ward on Ottawa City Council, and has been represented by Glen Gower since 2018. As of 2021, Stittsville ward had a population of 46,430.

Three school boards are represented in the area: Ottawa Catholic School Board, Ottawa-Carleton District School Board and Centre-East French Catholic School Board; Sacred Heart Catholic High School, Frederick Banting Secondary Alternate Program and École secondaire catholique Paul-Desmarais are the high schools.

Stittsville is home to multiple municipal services: Ottawa Fire Services' station 81, Ottawa Police Service 211 Huntmar station, the Stittsville branch of the Ottawa Public Library. It also has a branch of ServiceOntario.

Founded in 1854, the original location of the village was centred around Carp Road and Hazeldean Road; this area is now called Old Stittsville. In 1870, the Carleton Country Fire destroyed most of the buildings in the community. Villagers rebuilt around the newly constructed Canadian Pacific Railway. In 1990, the line was decommissioned, and its path is now part of the Trans-Canada Trail, running perpendicular to Stittsville Main Street, along Abbott Street East.

History

1800s 
Goulbourn Township was founded in 1818 by Irish soldiers in a military settlement program after the War of 1812. The area continued to receive most of its settler population from Ireland. The village of Stittsville was officially founded in 1854, when its first post office was constructed. Jackson Stitt was chosen as its first postmaster, and the village became known as Stittsville.

By 1866, Stittsville was a post village with a population of 100, situated in the township of Goulbourn. The village contained one general store, one common school, with an average attendance of seventeen pupils. The Loyal Orange Lodge, No. 210, met in Orange Hall, on the first Thursday in each month. The hall is now home to the Royal Canadian Legion branch in Stittsville. The citizens included John S Argue, general merchant and postmaster. This original location of the village is now known as "Old Stittsville" and was centered around current Carp Road and Neil Avenue.

The Carleton County Fire of 1870 destroyed almost all of Stittsville. It is believed the fire was started by brush burning for the construction of the Central Canadian Railway through the area. By this time, the village had 100 citizens and had grown its community to include churches, a fairground, and multiple specialty tradesmen. Kemp's Tavern on Hazeldean road, built in 1868, which now houses "Cabotto's Restaurant" and a handful of other buildings were all that was left standing.

On September 16, 1870, the first train passed through Stittsville as it was being re-built around the line. Most notably, the line would eventually serve as part of the Canadian Pacific Railway.

1900s 
The last train to come through the town was a VIA rail passenger train headed for Western Canada on January 14, 1990. After the rail line was deconstructed, the path was turned into a section of the Trans-Canada Trail.

In 1898, a campground for the Holiness Movement was created in Stittsville. The local leader at the time was Bishop Ralph Horner. The campground was used by members of the movement every summer until 1974, when it closed permanently.

2000s 
In 2001, the amalgamation of the Regional Municipality of Ottawa–Carleton took place. Goulbourn Township was included in the amalgamation, becoming a part of the City of Ottawa. Goulbourn Township included the town of Stittsville, making Stittsville a community within the new City of Ottawa.

On September 9, 2013, one of Stittsville's historic buildings was destroyed in a fire. Located at 1518 Stittsville Main Street, it was under renovations at the time of the fire.

Historic buildings 
The Bradley/Craig barn and farmhouse are still found at their original location. Historically designated Concession XI, Lot 29, they are currently located at 590 Hazeldean Road in Stittsville. The land was claimed in 1821 by Joshua Bradley, for which he received a Crown land grant in 1824. The barn was built in 1873 by John Cummings, a craftsman who worked in Goulbourn Township. The barn was built to house the family's dairy herd. Throughout the 1870s the farmhouse was constructed by the Bradley family. The land was farmed by members of the family until the 2000s. The Bradley family owned the property until 2007, when it was sold.

The building that was best known as Green's Hotel is located at 1510 Stittsville Main Street, Stittsville, historically designated Lot 23, Concession X. The building is believed to have been built in either 1890 or 1894 by John Cummings. The original owner was S.J. Butler, who named the building the Pacific Hotel as it served visitors coming to Stittsville on the Canadian Pacific Railway. It is believed that Butler sold the hotel after his daughter, Lala Butler, was struck and killed by a train at the crossing in Stittsville. George Green was the subsequent owner, from which the name Green's Hotel began.

Before 2013, the Alexander's Hotel building stood beside Green's Hotel at 1518 Stittsville Main Street, Stittsville. Built for William Alexander in 1870 or 1871, it ran as a hotel until 1919. It was then purchased by the Bradley family (discussed above), becoming Bradley's General Store and serving the community until 1960.

The Stittsville United Church is one of the oldest congregations in Stittsville. In 1824, the first Methodist congregation in the Township of Goulbourn officially began under the leadership of 3 local residents: George Argue, James Wilson and Archibald Magee. The first log chapel of the congregation was built in 1845, on the land the church continues to stand on. Multiple iterations of the chapel were built over time. Notably, in 1883 a brick chapel was built, which still constitutes part of the modern day church structures. The other current structures of the church were constructed in 1952, 1963, and 2006.

Media
Stittsville's community newspaper is The Stittsville & Richmond Community Voice, which is distributed every second week by Canada Post. This newspaper was started in August 2019. It was formerly served by the weekly Stittsville News published by Metroland Media; its 2015 circulation was about 13,446. It was closed in January 2019 after being sold to Postmedia.

Stittsville was featured as one of the filming locations for the 1988 CBC TV Movie The Bobby Gimby Story.

The television series Stittsville on Patrol" was created by Christopher Redmond and stars "local Twitter hero" Ben Milks (aka bRian5or6). The show premiered in January 2021 to the highest ratings in Bell Fibe TV1 history. The series was renewed for a second season which aired in September 2021.

Notable residents 
 Erica Wiebe - Olympic Gold Medallist in Women's 75 kg. Freestyle Wrestling at the 2016 Summer Olympics
 Kathleen Edwards - Juno winning musician
 Paul MacLean - Hockey coach
 Dave Cameron - Hockey coach
 Guy Boucher - Hockey coach
 Cody Ceci - Professional hockey player, Pittsburgh Penguins hockey club.
 Matt Bradley - Retired professional hockey player, Washington Capitals hockey club. Arena named after Bradley.
 Craig Anderson - Professional goalie, Washington Capitals hockey club National Hockey League
 Julie Steggall - Member of 1994 Winter Olympics freestyle ski team

Neighbourhoods

Amberway  
Amberwood Village 
Bryanston Gate 
Blackstone 
Crossing Bridge 
Deer Run 
Fairwinds 
Forest Creek 
Fringewood 
Granite Ridge 
Jackson Trails 
Old Stittsville 
Poole Creek Village  
Timbermere 
Upcountry 
West Ridge Estates 
Westwind Farms 
Wyldewood

References

External links
 Stittsville Village Association
 Goulbourn Township Historical Society

Neighbourhoods in Ottawa
Former municipalities now in Ottawa